Sŏho station is a railway station in Sŏho 2-dong, Hŭngnam-guyŏk, Hamhŭng city, South Hamgyŏng province, North Korea on the P'yŏngra Line of the Korean State Railway; it is also one of the southern termini of the (narrow gauge) Sŏho Line.

History 
Originally called Sŏhojin station, the station was opened on 1 December 1922 by the Chosen Government Railway as part of the  Hamhŭng–Sŏhojin section of the Hamgyŏng Line. The station became the southern terminus of the narrow gauge Namhŭng Line (nowadays the Sõho Line) of the Sinhŭng Railway on 15 December 1936; the Sinhŭng Railway was bought and absorbed by the Chosen Railway on 22 April 1938. Sŏho station received its current name after the establishment of the DPRK.

References

Railway stations in North Korea